Andrea Deelstra (born 6 March 1985, in Niebert) is a Dutch long-distance runner.

Deelstra finished fifth at the 2015 Berlin Marathon and this finish qualified her for the 2016 Olympics.

References

External links

 

1985 births
Living people
Dutch female long-distance runners
Dutch female marathon runners
Dutch female steeplechase runners
People from Marum
Athletes (track and field) at the 2016 Summer Olympics
Athletes (track and field) at the 2020 Summer Olympics
Olympic athletes of the Netherlands
20th-century Dutch women
21st-century Dutch women
Sportspeople from Groningen (province)